Unidentiidae is a taxonomic family of sea slugs, specifically aeolid nudibranchs, marine gastropod molluscs in the superfamily Fionoidea.

Genera and species
Genera and species within the family Unidentiidae include:
 Pacifia Korshunova, Martynov, Bakken, Evertsen, Fletcher, Mudianta, Saito, Lundin, Schrödl & Picton, 2017 
 Pacifia goddardi (Gosliner, 2010) 
 Unidentia Millen & Hermosillo, 2012
 Unidentia angelvaldesi Millen & Hermosillo, 2012

References

External links